The canton of Lagny-sur-Marne is a French administrative division, located in the arrondissement of Torcy, in the Seine-et-Marne département (Île-de-France région).

Demographics

Composition 
At the French canton reorganisation which came into effect in March 2015, the canton was expanded from 4 to 14 communes:

Carnetin
Chalifert
Chanteloup-en-Brie
Conches-sur-Gondoire
Dampmart
Gouvernes
Guermantes
Jablines
Lagny-sur-Marne
Lesches
Montévrain
Pomponne
Saint-Thibault-des-Vignes  
Thorigny-sur-Marne

See also
Cantons of the Seine-et-Marne department
Communes of the Seine-et-Marne department

References

Lagny sur marne